Tidal Wave (or Oasis presents Tidal Wave for sponsorship purposes) is a giant 'Shoot-the-Chutes' water ride located at Thorpe Park in Surrey, England, UK. It was opened in 2000 and was Tussauds' first major investment in the park before the Colossus rollercoaster in 2002.

When the ride was constructed in 2000 it was the tallest water ride in Europe and retained the title until 2002, when Hydro at Oakwood Theme Park was opened.

Theme

The ride is set in a 1960s New England-style fishing village "Amity Cove", which appears to have been hit by a tidal wave. Throughout Amity Cove, a pastiche radio station named "WWTP Radio" plays pop and surf music from the era (for example The Beach Boys and Elvis Presley), along with parody advertisements, news reports and interviews with village characters. The area originally had many scenic features, effects and visual gags on this theme, though today much has disappeared.

The ride's queueline is host to a number of partially-ruined buildings, including a bathroom with a leaking shower, an overflowing toilet and a house with a boat stuck in its roof. The station is built at an angle to give the impression that the building is sinking. Upon leaving the ride, guests are led through an open-fronted shack above the end of the track, directly in front of the splash down. As the boat hits the water, the wave travels straight towards this building and often continues on to the pathway behind.

Originally around the splash pool were several large effects, such as a giant water tower which released a torrent of water, the sound of a church organ coming from the spire of a sunken church and a gas tank that exploded with a giant flame. The gas tank no longer operates because the cylinders that were used to fuel the flame were removed during the construction of Stealth and never replaced.

Shops

The area also features a few food outlets - a doughnut shop called Amity Naughty Bites and a kebab shop called 'The Amity Kebab Co.' (the Tidal Wave photo unit is located directly above the kebab shop). A small Ben & Jerry's kiosk is also located at Tidal Wave's exit. In addition, the area houses a fish and chip shop, known as 'Amity Fish & Chips'.
There are also shops in Amity, Thorpe Park's largest shop (called Thorpe Mega Store) and there is also a Tickets and Information kiosk next to Tidal Wave's entrance selling Fastrack and Bounce Back tickets.

There is also a KFC in the area, which fits into the theme as it looks like a 1950s American diner. Inside, there are broken mirrors on the walls and the ceiling appears to be damaged by the tidal wave.
The restaurant has a life-sized shark piece of theming that appears to have been slammed into the side of the building.

A Burger King is also located within the area, and is themed, in a very similar fashion to the KFC, as a 1950s diner.

Sponsorship
From 2006 to 2009, the ride was sponsored by Original Source and then by Dr. Pepper from 2010 to 2018. In 2019, Oasis was announced as the new sponsor of the ride.

Other rides

In anticipation for Stealth, the Amity area was extended towards the Teacups (a traditional fairground 'teacups' ride). The Teacups were rethemed, with cracks painted onto the cups and the ride was renamed "Storm In A Teacup". Stealth was the signature attraction in Thorpe Park when it opened and when the Flying Fish was relocated in 2007 it was also fitted to the Amity theme. In 2008, Time Voyagers, a new 4D film opened, extending Amity towards a fish and chip restaurant. In 2011, Storm Surge, a spinning rapids ride opened opposite Tidal Wave.

References

External links

Tidal Wave at Thorpe Park's official website
Tidal Wave at ThemeParks-UK

Thorpe Park water rides
Shoot the Chute rides
Amusement rides introduced in 2000